This is the discography of the English new wave band the Fixx.

Albums

Studio albums

Live albums

Compilation albums

Video albums

Singles

Notes

References

Discographies of British artists
Rock music group discographies
New wave discographies